Breitenfelde is an Amt ("collective municipality") in the district of Lauenburg, in Schleswig-Holstein, Germany. Its seat is in Mölln.

The Amt Breitenfelde consists of the following municipalities (population in 2005 between brackets):

Alt Mölln (864)
Bälau (239)
Borstorf (307)
Breitenfelde (1,812)
Grambek (393)
Hornbek (176)
Lehmrade (463)
Niendorf an der Stecknitz (628)
Schretstaken (518)
Talkau (527)
Woltersdorf (280)

Ämter in Schleswig-Holstein